Raupatu is a Māori language word meaning "confiscation". It may refer to:

Land confiscated by the New Zealand Government during the New Zealand Wars
The Waikato Raupatu Claims Settlement Act 1995
"Raupatu" (song), 2017 single by Alien Weaponry